José Luis Gaspar Hernández (born 25 August 1995) is a Cuban athlete competing in the 400 metres hurdles. He represented his country at the 2016 Summer Olympics without advancing from the first round.

His personal best in the event is 49.17 seconds set in Havana in 2016.

International competitions

References

1995 births
Living people
Cuban male hurdlers
Athletes (track and field) at the 2015 Pan American Games
Athletes (track and field) at the 2019 Pan American Games
Pan American Games competitors for Cuba
Athletes (track and field) at the 2016 Summer Olympics
Olympic athletes of Cuba
World Athletics Championships athletes for Cuba
Competitors at the 2018 Central American and Caribbean Games
20th-century Cuban people
21st-century Cuban people